Les McCann Ltd. Plays the Shout (also referred to as The Shout) is a live album by pianist Les McCann recorded in 1960 and released on the Pacific Jazz label.

Reception

Allmusic gives the album 4 stars.

Track listing 
 "But Not for Me" (George Gershwin, Ira Gershwin) - 6:10
 "A Foggy Day" (Gershwin, Gershwin) - 8:10
 "The Shout" (Les McCann) - 4:50
 "Set Call: Sonar" (Gerald Wiggins) - 1:03
 "C Jam Blues" (Duke Ellington) - 7:06
 "Jubilation" (Junior Mance) - 3:25
 "A Night in Tunisia" (Dizzy Gillespie, Frank Papparelli) - 4:50
 "Set Call: Cute" (Neil Hefti) - 2:32

Personnel 
Les McCann - piano
Leroy Vinnegar - bass
Ron Jefferson - drums

References 

Les McCann live albums
1960 live albums
Pacific Jazz Records live albums